Sweetiee Weds NRI is a 2017 Indian Hindi film directed by Hasnain Hyderabadwala, and produced by Asmiy Entertainment and Grand Motion Picture. It stars Himansh Kohli and Zoya Afroz in the lead roles along with Darshan Jariwala, Kiran Juneja in Supporting roles and had its theatrical release on 2 June 2017.

Plot
Sweetiee Desai is a happy go lucky Gujarati girl of around 22 years, born to a wealthy business man of Baroda. Her father is a jolly good person with only one ambition – to get his daughter married to an NRI from England. The reason being he was deported from the UK many years back.

Cast

 Himansh Kohli as Aakash Patel
 Zoya Afroz as Sweety Desai
 Darshan Jariwala as Bhoolabhai Desai
 Kiran Juneja as Jigna Desai
 Babloo Mukherji as Bubba Banerji
 Adi Irani as Jazz Mehta
 Ankit Arora as Rashiklal "Rascal" Mehta
 Shekhar Shukla as Amit Shah
 Farzil Pardiwalla as DK
 Shreyas Pardiwallaas Einstein (Guest Appearance)
 Shruti Gholap as Shruti Banerji
 Saadhvi Singh as Aalia
 Lipi Goyal as Druma
 Vikrant Sakhalkar as Chaman Bhai
 Babloo Mukherjee as Professor

Soundtrack

The music of the film is composed by Arko Pravo Mukherjee, Palash Muchhal, Jaidev Kumar, Raaj Aashoo and Shah Jahan Ali while the lyrics were written by Banjara Rafi, Muchhal, Mukherjee, Shakeel Azmi, Dr. Devendra Kafir and Shyam Bhateja. Its first song titled as "O Saathiya" sung by Armaan Malik and Prakriti Kakar was released on 10 May 2017. The second song "Musafir" sung by Atif Aslam and Muchhal was released on 16 May 2017. The third song titled as "Kudi Gujrat Di" which is sung by Akasa Singh, Jasbir Jassi and Sonia Sharma and Rapped By KD was released on 18 May 2017. The fourth song to be released was "Musafir (Reprise)" which is sung by Arijit Singh was released on 22 May 2017. The soundtrack was released on 24 May 2017 by T-Series.

Critical reception

References

External links
 

2017 films
Indian romantic comedy films
Films about Indian weddings
2010s Hindi-language films
Films scored by Palash Muchhal
2017 romantic comedy films
Films scored by Arko Pravo Mukherjee
Films scored by Raaj Aashoo
Films scored by Jaidev Kumar